The following timeline traces the territorial evolution of the U.S. State of Utah.

Timeline
Historical territorial claims of Spain in the present State of Utah:
Nueva Vizcaya, 1562–1821
Santa Fé de Nuevo Méjico, 1598–1821
Gran Cuenca, 1776–1821
Adams-Onís Treaty of 1819
Treaty of Córdoba of 1821
Historical territorial claims of Mexico in the present State of Utah:
Santa Fé de Nuevo México, 1821–1848
Gran Cuenca, 1821–1848
Treaty of Guadalupe Hidalgo of 1848
Historical political divisions of the United States in the present State of Utah:
Unorganized territory created by the Treaty of Guadalupe Hidalgo, 1848–1850
Compromise of 1850
State of Deseret (extralegal), 1849–1850
Territory of Utah, 1850–1896
Utah Organic Act, September 9, 1850
Eastern portion of the Utah Territory is incorporated into the new Territory of Colorado, February 28, 1861
Western portion of the Utah Territory is incorporated into the new Territory of Nevada, March 2, 1861
North-eastern portion of the Utah Territory is transferred to the Territory of Nebraska, March 2, 1861
Western 53 miles of the Utah Territory is transferred to the Territory of Nevada, July 14, 1862
Another 53 miles of the Utah Territory is transferred to the State of Nevada, May 5, 1866
North-eastern corner of the Utah Territory is incorporated into the new Territory of Wyoming, July 25, 1868
Utah Enabling Act, July 16, 1894
Territory of Jefferson (extralegal), 1859–1861
State of Utah since January 4, 1896

See also
History of Utah
Territorial evolution of the United States
Utah Transfer of Public Lands Act
 Territorial evolution of Arizona
 List of territorial claims and designations in Colorado
 Territorial evolution of Idaho
 Territorial evolution of Nevada
 Territorial evolution of New Mexico
 Territorial evolution of Wyoming

References

External links
State of Utah website
Utah History
Utah State History

Pre-statehood history of Utah
Utah
Utah
Utah
Geography of Utah